James McPhie VC (18 December 1894 – 14 October 1918) was a Scottish recipient of the Victoria Cross, the highest and most prestigious award for gallantry in the face of the enemy that can be awarded to British and Commonwealth forces.

Details
McPhie was 23 years old, and a corporal in the 416th (Edinburgh) Field Company, Corps of Royal Engineers, British Army during the First World War when the following deed took place for which he was awarded the VC.

On 14 October 1918 at the Canal de la Sensée near Aubencheul-au-Bac, Nord, France, Corporal McPhie was with a party of sappers maintaining a cork float bridge, which when our infantry started to cross it just before dawn began to break away and sink. Corporal McPhie jumped into the water and tried to hold the cork and timbers together but this proved impossible so he swam back and collected the materials for repair. Although it was daylight and the bridge was under close fire he then led the way to the bridge, axe in hand. He was severely wounded and died almost at once. However, the bridge was kept open and 1/2nd Battalion London Regiment were able to maintain their bridgehead on the opposite bank until relieved.

His grave is at Naves, about 6 km east of Cambrai.

He was commemorated on the war memorial doorway in St George's Church, Charlotte Square, Edinburgh, and, when the church was closed and the memorial demolished, on a plaque in St Andrew's & St George's West Church. He is also commemorated by a bench in West Princes Street Gardens under the Royal Scots Grey statue, there is also a memorial stone at the corner of Brown St. Edinburgh].

The medal

His Victoria Cross is displayed at the Imperial War Museum, London, England.

Notes

References
Monuments to Courage (David Harvey, 1999)
The Register of the Victoria Cross (This England, 1997)
The Sapper VCs (Gerald Napier, 1998)
Scotland's Forgotten Valour (Graham Ross, 1995)
VCs of the First World War - The Final Days 1918 (Gerald Gliddon, 2000)
 Maj C.H. Dudley Ward, The Fifty Sixth Division, 1st London Territorial Division, 1914–1918, London: John Murray, 1921/Uckfield: Naval & Military Press, 2001, . 
 Brig-Gen Sir James E. Edmonds & Lt-Col R. Maxwell-Hyslop, History of the Great War: Military Operations, France and Belgium 1918, Vol V, 26th September–11th November, The Advance to Victory, London: HM Stationery Office, 1947/Imperial War Museum and Battery Press, 1993, 
 Maj W.E. Grey, 2nd City of London Regiment (Royal Fusiliers) in the Great War 1914–19, London: Regimental Headquarters, 1929//Uckfield, Naval & Military Press, 2002, .

External links
Royal Engineers Museum Sappers VCs
 

1894 births
1918 deaths
Military personnel from Edinburgh
Royal Engineers soldiers
British Army personnel of World War I
British World War I recipients of the Victoria Cross
British military personnel killed in World War I
British Army recipients of the Victoria Cross